Jonril: Gateway to the Sunken Lands is a 1982 fantasy role-playing game supplement published by Midkemia Press.

Contents
Jonril: Gateway to the Sunken Lands details a large city designed for use with most fantasy role-playing systems, which is populated with a wide variety of characters.

Reception
Kelly Grimes reviewed Jonril: Gateway to the Sunken Lands in The Space Gamer No. 61. Grimes commented that "Jonril is a very worthwhile setup. It is well put together, and can be used without too much pregame planning. It's well worth the money."

Reviews
 Different Worlds #28 (April, 1983)

References

Fantasy role-playing game supplements
Midkemia Press
Role-playing game supplements introduced in 1982